"The Living Christ: The Testimony of the Apostles" is a 2000 restatement of doctrine of the Church of Jesus Christ of Latter-day Saints (LDS Church).

Description
The document is a one-page declaration that was issued on January 1, 2000 and was signed by the fifteen apostles in the LDS Church: the three members of the First Presidency and the members of the Quorum of the Twelve Apostles. The declaration commemorates the birth of Jesus and is a reaffirmation of church doctrines and teachings about him. The text includes quotations of significant scriptural passages from the Bible and other LDS Church scriptures and identifies Jesus as the Jehovah of the Old Testament and Messiah of the New Testament.

According to the Church of Jesus Christ of Latter-day Saints, the document is meant to commemorate the birth of Jesus Christ approximately two millenia prior.

Contents
Although the Proclamation presents no new doctrines, it provides an official statement of the church on Jesus. Throughout the work are titles of Jesus.

Titles of Jesus 
 Jesus Christ
 Jehovah of the Old Testament
 Messiah of the New Testament
 Creator
 Firstborn of the Father
 Only Begotten Son in the flesh
 Firstfruits of them that slept
 Redeemer of the world
 Risen Lord
 Living Christ
 The First and the Last
 Advocate with the father
 King of Kings
 Lord of Lords
 Immortal Son of God
 King Immanuel
 The light, the life, and the hope of the world

Use and purpose
Since it was issued, the document has been frequently featured in church magazines and publications. One commentator has suggested that "the document may have been created to strengthen LDS Christian claims". The Church has recommended that members place a copy somewhere in their home where they will see it, and to study the document often.

Signatures
The document was signed by the following individuals:

See also

Public relations of The Church of Jesus Christ of Latter-day Saints
The Family: A Proclamation to the World
The Restoration of the Fulness of the Gospel of Jesus Christ: A Bicentennial Proclamation to the World
Proclamations of the First Presidency and the Quorum of the Twelve Apostles

Notes

External links
"The Living Christ: The Testimony of the Apostles", churchofjesuschrist.org
"The Living Christ: The Testimony of the Apostles", churchofjesuschrist.org (PDF)

2000 documents
2000 in Christianity
Latter Day Saint statements of faith
Latter Day Saint doctrines regarding deity
Jesus in Christianity
The Church of Jesus Christ of Latter-day Saints texts
Works by apostles (LDS Church)